Repeat Deceiver is the second album by the American singer-songwriter Graham Alexander, released on December 19, 2014 by Victor Talking Machine Company. Recording sessions for the album took place at several locations from 2013 to 2014. The album's production was credited to songwriter Graham Alexander.

Background
After the release of his debut album Graham Alexander in December 2011, Alexander and his band embarked on a tour throughout 2012 and 2013, including stops at the Abbey Road on the River Festival, the Black Potato Music Festival, Non-COMMvention, Quick Chek Festival of Ballooning, and Musikfest. Graham Alexander started performing in his second Broadway show, Let It Be during the recording of his second album.

Track listing

Personnel
 Graham Alexander – electric guitar, acoustic guitar, acoustic 12 string (1, 4, 5, 7, 8, 9, 10), piano (3, 5, 9), bass, 6 string bass, mandocello (5), string arrangements (2, 3, 6), drums (5), lead guitar (2, 7), synths, percussion
 Zach Harski –  lead guitar (1, 2, 3, 4, 7, 8, 9, 10), piano (1), organ (1, 6, 8), bass on (6), backing vocals (1, 2, 4, 9, 10), strings arrangements (2, 3, 6), handclaps, mandolin (10)
 Fran Smith Jr. – bass, backing vocals
 Mike Crawford – drums on (6, 8)
 Ben Barclay – bass (8), backing vocals (10)
 Rob Fini – piano (8), backing vocals (2, 3, 5, 7, 10)
 Ally Jenkins – violin, string arrangements (2, 3, 5, 6) 
 Jay Davidson – tenor and baritone saxophones (4, 6) horn arrangements, sax solo (6)
 Adam Flicker – trumpet (4, 6)
 John Forster – percussion, handclaps
 Dr. Dave Appleby – backing vocals (10)

References

2014 albums
Graham Alexander (musician) albums